Epidendrum magnoliae, sometimes called Epidendrum conopseum or the green-fly orchid, is a species of orchid in the genus Epidendrum. It is the most northern-growing epiphytic orchid in North America, being found wild in the southeastern United States from Louisiana to North Carolina, and also in northeastern Mexico (Nuevo León, San Luis Potosí, Tamaulipas).

One plant will produce 6-14 flowers, pale green to bronze-colored.

The diploid chromosome number of E. magnoliae has been determined as 2n = 40, the haploid chromosome number as n = 20.

References

External links
Discover Life
H. G. Reichenbach "ORCHIDES" in Müller, Carl, Ed. Walpers Annales Botanices Systematicae 6(1861)408. Berlin. Described as E. conopseum
 Epidendrum conopseum - Wildlife Resources Division, From: Patrick, Allison and Krakow (1995), Protected Plants of Georgia, Georgia Department of Natural Resources drawing, description, ecological information
IOSPE photos photo
Greenfly Orchids (Epidendrum magnoliae) in situ. video showing Epidendrum magnoliae in the wild in Florida
Lady Bird Johnson Wildflower Center, University of Texas
Atlas of Florida Vascular Plants,  Epidendrum conopseum

magnoliae
Flora of the Southeastern United States
Flora of Northeastern Mexico
Orchids of Florida
Plants described in 1813
Taxa named by Gotthilf Heinrich Ernst Muhlenberg
Flora without expected TNC conservation status